The Shiva crater is the claim by paleontologist Sankar Chatterjee and colleagues that the Bombay High and Surat Depression on the Indian continental shelf west of Mumbai, India represent a  impact crater, that formed around the Cretaceous-Paleogene boundary. Chatterjee and colleagues have claimed that this could have contributed to the K-Pg extinction event. Other scholars have questioned the claims, finding that there is no evidence of an impact structure.

Arguments 
Chatterjee argues that the Shiva crater was formed around 65 million years ago, about the same time as a number of other impact craters and the Cretaceous–Paleogene extinction event (Cretaceous–Paleogene boundary / K-Pg boundary). If its status as an impact crater is ever confirmed, the Shiva crater would be the largest known impact crater on Earth.

At the time of the Cretaceous–Paleogene extinction, India was located over the Réunion hotspot of the Indian Ocean. Hot material rising from the mantle flooded portions of India with a vast amount of lava, creating a plateau known as the Deccan Traps. It has been hypothesized that either the crater or the Deccan Traps associated with the area is the reason for the high level of oil and natural gas reserves in the region.

Geology and morphology 
It is also unusually rectangular. Chatterjee argues that the low angle of an impact combined with boundary fault lines and unstable rock led to this unusual formation. The age of the structure is inferred from the Deccan Traps which overlie part of it.

Shiva and mass extinction 

The proposed Shiva crater and other possible impact craters along with the Chicxulub crater have led to the hypothesis that multiple impacts caused the massive extinction event at the end of the Cretaceous period. Chatterjee is confident that Shiva was one of many impacts, stating that "the K-T extinction was definitely a multiple-impact scenario." Other theories have argued that since the Chicxulub impact is believed by some researchers to have occurred earlier than the extinction of the non-avian dinosaurs, Shiva's impact was enough to cause the mass extinction by itself. Evidence published in a 2013 Science article by Paul R. Renne at the University of California at Berkeley suggests that the Chicxulub crater is in fact within the time frame of when the mass extinction occurred.

Criticism 
The claims of an impact crater have been criticised. Christian Koeberl, a Professor of Geology at the University of Vienna and a specialist on impact craters, described the claims in 2004 as "a figment of imagination", stating that the claims were "inconsistent not only with the regional geology and geophysics, but also with anything we know about impact cratering." American geologist Gerta Keller stated in 2007, "We have worked extensively throughout India and investigated a number of the localities where Sankar Chatterjee claims to have evidence of a large impact he calls Shiva crater... Unfortunately, we have found no evidence to support his claims. Sorry to say, this is all nonsense." Geophysicist Steve Gulick stated in the same year, "There's a bunch of problems to say the least. There is no evidence that [Chatterjee is] presenting of it actually being a crater", and described the oval shape of the structure as unlikely for an impact crater. In the chapter "Impact Cratering from an Indian Perspective", from the 2013 book Earth System Processes and Disaster Management, geologists Jayanta K. Pati and Puniti Pati write that "...the proposed Shiva structure in the Arabian Sea to the southwest of the Indian subcontinent (Chatterjee et al. 2006) have also been suggested to be of possible impact origin. However, Chatterjee et al. (2006) do not provide any substantial evidence for the existence of a crater structure and certainly not for the existence of an impact structure at Shiva."

See also 

 Impact craters in India
 Lonar crater at Lonar in Buldhana district of Maharashtra
 Luna crater at Kutch district of Gujarat
 Ramgarh Crater in Mangrol tehsil of Baran district of Rajasthan
 Other related topics
 List of impact craters on Earth
 List of possible impact structures on Earth

 Indian Ocean submerged features
 Central Indian Ridge
 Southeast Indian Ridge
 Southwest Indian Ridge
 Rodrigues Triple Junction

Notes

References

External links 
 The Shiva Crater: Implications for Deccan Volcanism, India-seychelles Rifting, Dinosaur Extinction, and Petroleum Entrapment at the Kt Boundary by Chatterjee, Sankar; Guven, Necip; Yoshinobu, Aaaron; and Donofrio, Richard;  Paper No. 60-8, 2003 Seattle Annual Meeting of Geological Society of America (November 2–5, 2003).
 Deep Impact - Shiva: Another K-T Impact? by Leslie Mullen for Astrobiology Magazine (Nov. 2004).
 The Complete Catalog of the Earth's Impact structures
 Shiva Structure: A Possible KT Boundary Impact Crater on the Western Shelf of India

Impact craters of India
Possible impact craters on Earth
Cretaceous impact craters
Geology of the Indian Ocean